Edward Harrell Emory Sr. (April 14, 1937 – January 4, 2013) was an American football player and coach.  He became East Carolina University's 14th head football coach in 1980. In 1983, he guided the Pirates to an 8–3 record and a #20 ranking in the Associated Press final national poll. His three losses came at the hands of Florida State, Florida, and Miami (Florida). The football team lost by a combined score of 13 points. Before coaching, Emory went to school at East Carolina College and was a three-year varsity letter winner and was third-team All-American in his senior year.  He was inducted into the ECU Hall of Fame in 2003.

Emory  returned to coaching at the high school level and served as head coach of the perennial North Carolina powerhouse, Richmond Senior High School in Rockingham, North Carolina, from 2001 to 2006, compiling at 77–7 record in that six-year span.

Emory died at his home in Wadesboro, North Carolina on January 4, 2013.

Head coaching record

College

References

1938 births
2013 deaths
Clemson Tigers football coaches
Duke Blue Devils football coaches
East Carolina Pirates football players
East Carolina Pirates football coaches
Georgia Tech Yellow Jackets football coaches
Wake Forest Demon Deacons football coaches
High school football coaches in North Carolina
People from Lancaster, South Carolina